Garrett Sheehan is a former judge of the Irish Court of Appeal from 2014 until 2017. Prior to his appointment to the Court of Appeal, he was a judge of the Irish High Court from 2007.

He was educated at University College Dublin and the Law Society of Ireland. He was enrolled as a solicitor in 1969. He is a bencher of the King's Inns.

He retired from the bench in 2017. On 9 December 2020, he was appointed by President Michael D. Higgins to the position of Chairperson of the Standards in Public Office Commission.

References

Living people
Irish solicitors
Alumni of University College Dublin
Judges of the Court of Appeal (Ireland)
High Court judges (Ireland)
21st-century Irish judges
Year of birth missing (living people)